Landmark College is a private college in Putney, Vermont, designed exclusively for students who learn differently, including students with a learning disability (such as dyslexia), ADHD, autism or executive function challenges.

Established in 1985, Landmark College was the first institution of higher learning to pioneer college-level studies for students with dyslexia.

Offering associate and bachelor's degree programs in the liberal arts and sciences, Landmark College is accredited by the New England Commission of Higher Education (NECHE).

History 
The campus the college occupies originally belonged to Windham College. After Windham shuttered in 1978, the campus remained unused. Plans for a prison and for a conference center fell through. Putney Selectman Peter Shumlin was instrumental in persuading the government to allow Landmark School in Beverly, Massachusetts, to start a college on the dormant campus. Landmark College was established in 1985.

Lynda Katz  was president from 1994 to 2011, when Peter Eden took the helm.

Landmark began offering bachelor's degrees in 2012.

The college built a $9.6 million, 28,500 square foot science and technology center named the MacFarlane Building in 2015. It was the first building erected since the college's founding.

Educational approach 
Applicants are required to document average to above average intelligence with the ability to complete college level work; along with a condition that impairs learning, such as dyslexia, attention deficit hyperactivity disorder, or autism spectrum disorder. All students are offered personal, directed assistance in their studies. The student to faculty ratio of 6:1 is small by postsecondary standards. Classroom faculty employ universal design principles, integrated assistive technology elements, individualized attention, and multi-modal teaching strategies in their courses.

Costs 
Tuition and fees for 2022–23 were $76,680, making it the 50th most expensive college according to The National Center for Education Statistics. Tuition and fees for the 2015–2016 year were $51,330. In 2015, it topped CNN Money's list of most expensive colleges. It was also the most expensive four-year, private non-profit by list price according to the Department of Education's rankings for the 2012–2013 year; fees including room and board were reported to be $59,930 in 2013 and $61,910 in 2015. Scholarships of up to $30,000 are available.

Students 
Students come from across the United States and from around the world to attend Landmark College. The average age is 20 years, and about 97% of students live on campus. The male-to-female student ratio is about 3:1, which reflects the higher number of males who are diagnosed with conditions that affect learning. Students are not required to have taken the SAT or ACT examinations. About half of Landmark's full-time students transferred from another college due reasons such as lack of academic support, difficult-to-access academic support at former schools, or a reluctance to disclose and seek help for their disability. Student turnover is high; as the school originally offered associate degrees or because some students plan to master academic success strategies and return to their previous college. However, there are now several bachelor's degrees offered.

Academics 
The college offers associate degrees and since 2012 has offered bachelor's degrees. Additionally, a post-baccalaureate certificate in Learning Differences and Neurodiversity aimed at education professionals was introduced in 2018.

Secondary school students in several areas of Landmark's county, Windham, can access dual-enrollment NEASC accredited courses. Middle school students can participate in a summer program called "Expanded Learning Opportunities in Science, Technology, Engineering and Mathematics."

In 2011, The New York Times reported that 30% of students in the associate program graduated within three years; many drop out in their first or second semester. Of those that graduate, a third drop out. Many students struggling at other colleges go to Landmark for a "bridge semester" to learn to manage their learning differences in an academic setting.

High school program 
The three-week-long High School Program is intended to assist high school students entering their Junior or Senior year who learn differently develop self-understanding and self-advocacy skills.

Student life 
Housing options range from suite living to traditional residence halls. All rooms are designed as doubles or singles. Residential halls are equipped with wireless Internet, cable television, laundry facilities, and common lounge space, as well as full-time residential staff. Some suite buildings have kitchens.

Impressions literary magazine, The Independent student newspaper, and WLMC student internet radio station are among the print and audio media. The Landmark College Athletic Department provides club, intramural, and intercollegiate sports and fitness activities for students.

Notable alumni 
 Quinn Bradlee, filmmaker, author, and disability advocate
 Dave Cole, visual artist and sculptor
 Ennis Cosby (d. 1997), only son of American comedian Bill Cosby

Notable staff 
 Alice B. Fogel, poet and writer; English professor
 Lesle Lewis, poet; English professor

References

External links 
Official website

Buildings and structures in Putney, Vermont
Education in Windham County, Vermont
Educational institutions established in 1985
Learning disabilities
Putney, Vermont
Special schools in the United States
Private universities and colleges in Vermont
1985 establishments in Vermont